Rizabawa (24 September 1966 – 13 September 2021) was an Indian actor who works predomiantly in Malayalam films and television. His breakthrough role was as a villain in the 1990 film In Harihar Nagar. Since then, he acted as villain in several films in 1990s.

Early life

Career
Rizabawa started his career in theatre. Even though Rizabawa played the hero in his debut film Dr. Pasupathy directed by Shaji Kailas, his first noticed role in Malayalam films was from the director Duo Siddique-Lal in the movie In Harihar Nagar. His role John Honai became a breakthrough role for him, a villain. He later moved into the small-screen industry, acting in a number of Malayalam serials. He continued to be a villain in many other films, including Irikku MD Akathundu, Vakkeel Vasudev, Thiruthalvaadi, and Malappuram Haji Mahanaya Joji. Later in his career, Rizabawa acted in the Malayalam film industry in supporting roles. He has also acted in many serials from 2002 until his death.

Personal life
He has a daughter. He died from a kidney-related illness on 13 September 2021 and also tested positive for Covid-19.

Awards
Kerala State Film Awards
 2010 – Best Dubbing Artist:  – Karmayogi

Filmography

Films

 Professor Dinkan (2023) Not Released 
 Mahaveeryar (2022)
 Lal Jose (2022)
 One (2021)
 Aarodum Parayathe (2019)
 Velakkaariyaayirunthalum Neeyen Mohavalli (2018)
 Pranayatheertham (2018)
 Stethoscope (2017)
 Tharakangale Sakshi (2015)
 Kohinoor (2015)
 John Honai (2015)
 Nirnnayakam (2015)
 Asha Black (2014)
 Zachariayude Garbhinikal (2013)
 Ente (2013)
 Mizhi (2013)
 Paisa Paisa (2013)
 Proprietors: Kammath & Kammath (2013)
 Avanthipuram 2013 ( Telugu )
 Police Maman (2013)
 Village Guys (2013)
 Aakashanagaram (2013)
 Veendum Kannur (2012)
 The Hitlist (2012)
 Track (2012)
 Simhasanam (2012)
 Vaidooryam (2012) .... Shekharan
 Ee Adutha Kaalathu (2012)
 Sthalam (2012)
 Karmayogi (2012)
 The King & The Commissioner (2012)
 Ponnu Kondoru Aalroopam (2011)
 Swargam 9 km (2011)
 Sahasram (2010)
 Chaverpada (2010)
 Pokkiri Raja (2010) as Home Minister Kumaran
 Avan (2010) as Avan
 2 Harihar Nagar (2009) Cameo
 Thirunakkara Perumal (2009)
 Duplicate (2009) as Mahendran Thampi
 Ali Imran (2009)
 Twenty 20 (2008) Photo Archieve
 Sound of Boot (2008) as Abdul Sathar
 College Kumaran (2008) as Vikraman
 Mulla (2008) as Venu
 Paradesi (2007)
 Nasrani (2007) as Eappachan
 Nagaram (2007) as Enashu Vakkeel
 Kichamani MBA (2007)
 Bharathan Effect (2007)
 Hallo (2007) as Dinu Bhai
 Romeoo (2007) as Ramanathan
 Vadakkum Nathan (2006) as Shankarankutty
Kisan (Ilakal Pacha Pookkal Manja) (2006) as Balarama Varma
 Balaram Vs Tharadas (2006)
 Kaasu (2006; Tamil)
 Mahasamudram (2006) as Chandran
 Badadosth (2006) as Ravindranath Khurana
 Highway Police (2006) as Bhoominathan
 Nerariyan CBI (2005) as Dr. Babu
 Hridayathil Sookshikkan (2005)
 Manikyan (2005) as Sekhara Menon
 Thekkekkara Superfast (2004) .... Antappan
 Vismayathumbathu (2004) .... V. B. Prathapan
 Jalolsavam (2004)
 Mayilaattam (2004)
 Ivar (2003) .... Prem Kumar
 Meerayude Dukhavum Muthuvinte Swapnavum (2003) .... Advocate
 Kuberan (2002)
 Oomappenninu Uriyadappayyan (2002) .... Mukunda Varma
 Pakalpooram (2002)
 Sundariprav (2002)
 Ente Hridyathinte Udama (2002)
 Punyam (2001)
 Sravu (2001) as Sudeeran Pilla
 Maalavika (2001)
 Onnam Raagam (2001)
 Cover Story (2000) (as Risa Bava)
 Varnnakazhchakal (2000) as Thomachan
 Life Is Beautiful (2000) as Sindhu's Manager
 Summer Palace (2000)
 Rapid Action Force (2000)
 Crime File (1999) as Thomas
 Niram (1999) as Jinan
 Ezhupunna Tharakan (1999) as Gauri Nandana Varma
 The Godman (1999) as Joseph Chacko
 The Gang (1998)
 Soorya Vanam (1998)
 Ormacheppu (1998)
 Thattakam (1998)
 Bhoothakkannadi (1997) as Guard at prison
 Manasam (1997) .... Doctor
 Vamsam (1997)
 Shibiram (1997)
 Kannur (1997)
 Kadhanaayakan (1997)
 Asuravamsam (1997) .... Muhammad Hussain Haji
 Bhoothakannaadi  1997... Guard at prison
 Nagarapuranam (1997) .... Jayamohan
 Udyanapalakan (1996)
 Man of the Match (1996) .... Swamy Paramananda
 Sugavasam(1996)....Naresh Mehta
 Naalamkettile Nalla Thambimar (1996)
 Kalamasseriyil Kalyanayogam (1995) .... Anantharaman
 Sasinas (1995)
 Hijack (1995) .... Prasad
 Sreeragam (1995) .... Narasimhan
 Street (1995) .... Police Officer
 Thaksha Sheela (1995)
 Peterscott (1995)
 Sargavasantham (1995)
 Mangalam Veettil Manaseswari Gupta (1995) .... Sethumadhavan
 Aniyan Bava Chetan Bava (1995) .... Kannappan
 Vadhu Doctoranu (1994) .... Purushothaman
 Malappuram Haji Mahanaya Joji (1994)
 Manathe Kottaram (1994)
 Avan Ananda Padmanabhan (1994)
 Tharavaadu (Chathurvarnyam) (1994)
 Tharavadu (1994)
 Chukkan (1994) .... Vishwan
Thendral Varum Theru (1994; Tamil)
 Kabuliwala (1994) .... Venu
 Thalamura (1993)<ref>
 Aamina Tailors (1991) .... Nassar
 Sunday 7PM (1990)
 In Harihar Nagar(1990)John Honai (Actors Jagadish, Siddique, Mukesh)
 Dr. Pasupathy (1990) .... Pappen (Actors Innocent, Parvathi) as Pappan, Hero Debut
 Vishupakshi (1987) Not Released

As dubbing artist

Television

References

External links
 
 Rizabawa at MSI

1966 births
2021 deaths
20th-century Indian male actors
Male actors from Kochi
Male actors in Malayalam cinema
Indian male film actors
Kerala State Film Award winners
21st-century Indian male actors
Indian male television actors
Indian male voice actors
Male actors in Malayalam television